USS APL-24 is an APL-2-class barracks ship of the United States Navy.

Construction and career
The ship was laid down on 24 July 1944, by the Pollock-Stockton Shipbuilding Co. and launched on 26 September 1944. She was commissioned on 24 July 1945.

She was decommissioned on 24 March 1947 and put into the reserve fleet.

The ship was transferred to MARAD on 23 May 1962, renamed as FB-62 and used as a headquarter ship in Suisun Bay, California.

Awards 

 American Campaign Medal 
 World War II Victory Medal

References

 

 

Barracks ships of the United States Navy
Ships built in Stockton, California
1944 ships